Vincent Anthony Tarzia (born 24 September 1986) is an Australian politician representing the South Australian House of Assembly seat of Hartley for the South Australian Division of the Liberal Party of Australia since the 2014 state election. Tarzia served as the Minister for Police, Emergency Services and Correctional Services in the Marshall ministry between July 2020 and March 2022. He currently serves as the Shadow Minister for Infrastructure and Transport as well as Sport, Recreation and Racing as part of the South Australian Opposition.

Background and early career 

Tarzia attended St Joseph's School Payneham and Rostrevor College. During his time at Rostrevor, Tarzia was Head Prefect and Dux of the college. At the age of 14, he started his first job stacking shelves at a local Foodland.

Tarzia then went on to obtain law and commerce degrees at the University of Adelaide. He was a solicitor and worked in Funds Management, Legal and Commercial sectors.

Vincent is active in many local community and sporting groups, including Neighbourhood Watch, the Campbelltown Rotary Club, Norwood Football Club and Payneham RSL.

Political career 
Tarzia entered politics in 2010, serving as a Councillor of the City of Norwood Payneham & St Peters. He was elected 1st out of 7 candidates, defeating two long-term incumbents.

In 2012, Tarzia was pre-selected to challenge his local, north-eastern seat of Hartley. Tarzia won the seat of Hartley at the 2014 state election, after defeating the Labor incumbent Grace Portolesi.

In January 2016 Tarzia was appointed Shadow Parliamentary Secretary for Entrepreneurship, Innovation and Business Start-ups. In January 2017, Tarzia became Shadow Cabinet Parliamentary Secretary.

2018 Election 

On October 6, 2017, Nick Xenophon announced he would leave the senate and challenge Tarzia for the seat of Hartley in the 2018 state election. A month after Xenophon's announcement, Tarzia's predecessor, Grace Portolesi was announced as the Labor candidate for Hartley, turning the seat into a three-way contest. In early polls in January 2018, Xenophon was predicted to win Hartley, with articles naming Xenophon as the most influential person in South Australia. Despite being written off by the media, Tarzia went on to win the three-way race and retain Hartley convincingly, with 57.8% of the vote and a 4.7% swing towards him, despite a statewide swing of 1.1% against the Liberals.  Tarzia's victory was key in helping the Liberals win government for the first time since 2002.

On 3 May 2018, he was elected the 35th Speaker of the South Australian House of Assembly, becoming the youngest person to hold the office of Speaker in South Australian history and first of Italian Heritage. It is said that Tarzia was the youngest Speaker in the Commonwealth.

Speaker 

In December 2018, Tarzia became the first Australian Speaker to enable Question Time to be broadcast live on Facebook. This innovative decision opened up the South Australian Parliament to a new generation and has increased openness and accountability of the Parliament.

Ministerial career 
On 29 July 2020, Tarzia was appointed as Minister for Police, Emergency Services and Correctional Services, following a Cabinet reshuffle. As Minister, Tarzia introduced a number of road safety reforms in South Australia.

After calls for motorcycle licensing reform, Tarzia introduced the Motor Vehicles (Motor Bike Driver Licensing) Amendment Act 2021 into parliament which subsequently passed both houses on March 3, 2021. These laws raised the minimum age for obtaining a motorcycle learners permit from 16 to 18, and obtaining a full licence from 18 to 21.

On July 1, 2021, new laws were introduced to further penalise hoon drivers. Under the new law, South Australian drivers who have their car impounded have 38 days to pay their fine in full or face their vehicle being crushed or sold. Tarzia was quoted on ABC Radio asserting he has “no sympathy” for those who drive dangerously.

In November 2021, legislation introduced by Tarzia was passed targeting drug drivers. Under the new laws, drivers will be instantly stripped of their licence upon failing a roadside drug test.

In November 2020, Tarzia and the State Government delivered a $800,000 funding boost to Crime Stoppers SA. The funding injection was the first ever direct State Government funding for the organisation.

2022 Election 
At the 2022 South Australian election, Tarzia was re-elected for a third term as Member for Hartley. While the South Australian Liberal Party saw a two-party preferred swing against it of 6.52% in an election landslide, Tarzia retained his seat with a swing against him of only 3%. In April, 2022, Tarzia assumed the shadow portfolios of Infrastructure and Transport and Recreation, Sport and Racing.

References

 

1986 births
Living people
People educated at Rostrevor College
21st-century Australian politicians
Members of the South Australian House of Assembly
Speakers of the South Australian House of Assembly